The Death of a Bachelor Tour was a concert tour by Panic! at the Disco, in support of the group's fifth studio album Death of a Bachelor (2016). The tour began in Uncasville at the Mohegan Sun Arena on February 24, 2017, and concluded on April 15, 2017, in Sunrise at the BB&T Center. Adding gross estimates from those concerts yet to be reported, the overall box office take was about $17 million when the tour closed. About 350,000 fans saw the Death of a Bachelor Tour during its run.

Background and development 
On September 22, 2016, the band released the latest music video for "LA Devotee". With the release came the announcement of an arena tour in 2017. MisterWives and Saint Motel were announced as the opening acts.

Set list 
This set list is representative of the show on February 25, 2017 in Philadelphia. It is not representative of all concerts for the duration of the tour.

"Don't Threaten Me with a Good Time"
"LA Devotee"
"Ready to Go (Get Me Out of My Mind)"
"Golden Days"
"Vegas Lights"
"The Only Difference Between Martyrdom and Suicide Is Press Coverage" / "Camisado" / "But It's Better If You Do"
"Hallelujah"
"Nine in the Afternoon"
"Miss Jackson"
"This Is Gospel"
"Death of a Bachelor"
"The Ballad of Mona Lisa"
"Movin' Out (Anthony's Song)"
"Emperor's New Clothes"
"24K Magic" / "Bitch Better Have My Money" 
"Nicotine"
"Crazy=Genius"
"Let's Kill Tonight"
"Girls / Girls / Boys"
"Bohemian Rhapsody"
Encore
"I Write Sins Not Tragedies"
"Victorious"

Tour dates

References 

2017 concert tours
Panic! at the Disco